Kyle Dodd (born 11 February 1994) is a South African BMX cyclist. He competed in the men's BMX at the 2016 Summer Olympics. He finished 6th in his heat during the quarterfinals and did not advance to the semifinals.

References

External links
 
 
 

1994 births
Living people
BMX riders
South African male cyclists
Olympic cyclists of South Africa
Cyclists at the 2016 Summer Olympics